District of Columbia is a U.S. federal district which contains the national capital of the City of Washington.

District of Columbia or Columbia District or variant, may also refer to:

Washington DC related
 District of Columbia (until 1871)
 District of Columbia's at-large congressional district (federal U.S. House of Representatives)
 District of Columbia County, Washington, D.C. treated as a county
 Washington, D.C., the City of Washington, national capital of the United States
 District of Columbia Public Schools, school district of Washington, D.C.
 University of the District of Columbia (founded 1851)
 University of the District of Columbia Community College (founded 1851)
 District of Columbia School of Law (founded 1986)
 District of Columbia General Hospital
 Miss District of Columbia (disambiguation), a beauty pageant title

Other uses
 Columbia District, British North America; a former colonial district in the U.S. Pacific Northwest and Canadian Pacific regions, now mainly the province of British Columbia and state of Washington
 Columbia (electoral district), British Columbia, Canada; a provincial electoral district
 Columbia-Shuswap Regional District, British Columbia, Canada; a district containing Columbia Country
 Columbia Street Waterfront District, Brooklyn, NYC, NYS, USA
 Columbia Historic District (disambiguation)
 Columbia School District (disambiguation)

See also

 Washington district (disambiguation)
 
 
 
 
 Columbia Township (disambiguation)
 Columbia County (disambiguation)
 District (disambiguation)
 Columbia (disambiguation)
 Colombia (disambiguation)
 Districts of Colombia